The following is the squad list for the 2017 OFC U-19 Women's Championship. Each squad consisted of 20 players in total, 2 of whom had to be goalkeepers.

Head coach:  Saroj Kumar

Head coach:  Kamali Fitialeata



Head coach:  Rachel Wadunah

Head coach:  Martin Tamasese

Head coach:  Tiane Koaneti

References

External links
Official site at OFC.com

OFC U-19 Women's Championship
Association football women's tournament squads